Paw Thame (1948–2014) was a Burmese-American painter. He was one of the leaders of the modernist art movement in Burma during the 1970s.  Paw Thame, Win Pe, Kin Maung Yin and Bagyi Aung Soe were friends at the Peacock Gallery exchanging modernist ideas and concepts, alternatively supporting one another and locked in rivalry.  They built on the foundations laid by early Burmese modernists Aung Khin and Kin Maung (Bank).

Early life 
Paw Thame was largely self-taught although as a young man he spent much time in the studios of Aung Khin and Kin Maung (Bank).  He later claimed his influences were the international artists he had studied in books and that the only Burmese influences on his work were Kin Maung (Bank), Win Pe and Kin Maung Yin.

Peacock Gallery 
In the early 1970s, Paw Thame established an art school in Rangoon, the first in Myanmar, teaching the concepts of modern art.  Later he was the driving force behind the organization of the Peacock Gallery which opened in the late 1970s.  The other members of this vanguard gallery were Win Pe, Bagyi Aung Soe, Kin Maung Yin, Sonny Nyein, Gyee Saw, Nyi Nyi, Sein Myint and Ma Thanegi.  This groundbreaking gallery had a huge impact on the modern art scene there.  Until Paw Thame emigrated to the United States in 1984, this gallery was the only gallery of modern art in Burma.

Works 
Paw Thame works are varied, as he refused to limit himself in style or subject.  However, his creativity and bold brushstrokes, composition and colors set him apart from many others in his generation.

References

Bibliography 

 

 

1948 births
2014 deaths
20th-century Burmese painters
Burmese artists